Saiqa is a Pakistani television soap opera written by Moomal Shunaid and directed by Asim Ali which aired on Hum TV. Based on Razia Butt's famous novel of the same name, Saiqa is a mafia story with all the cliché twists, turns, lynching and manipulations. Shot on locations of Murree and Nathiagali, this dark story spans two generations.

The show was selected to air on Hum Europe Monday to Thursday from 6 October 2016 at 9pm.

Story
Saiqa is a love story with multiple twists, turns and manipulations. Shot on the locations of Murree and Nathiagali, this is a love story spanning two generations. The story focuses on Naaji and Tahir. Naaji is a village girl; while Tahir is an aristocrat who falls in love with and wants to marry her. Tahir is already engaged to Fauzia. His family does not want him to marry Naaji, but he does so. Naaji attempts suicide because of Fauzia. Tahir also dies after hearing of Naaji's reported death. Tahir and Naaji have a daughter, Saiqa. She grows up in the hateful atmosphere of her father's family mansion, with everybody insulting her at every step, and plotting to get rid of her and her mother. Rehan at the beginning hates Saiqa like every other person in the family but later he realises that he loves her. Sumaira (Madiha Iftikhar, Saiqa's cousin and Fauzia's daughter) loves Rehan and is about to marry him but hates Saiqa even more when she hears that Rehan loves Saiqa. The story takes an interesting  turn in the end.

Cast
 Sarwat Gilani as Naaji
 Sheema Kirmani as Old Naaji
 Mikaal Zulfiqar as Tahir
 Juggan Kazim as Saiqa
 Ahsan Khan as Rehan
 Mahjabeen as Fouzia
 Shamim Hilaly as Daadi Huzoor
 Khayyam Sarhadi as Abba Huzoor
 Ali Afzal as Azhar
 Ayesha Sana as Sadia
 Madiha Iftikhar as Sumaira
 Faiq Khan as Asad
 Hassan Ahmed as Fakhar
 Osama Muhammad Khalid as Abaq

References

External links
 Pakistani Drama

2009 Pakistani television series debuts
2009 Pakistani television series endings
Pakistani drama television series
Urdu-language television shows
Pakistani television soap operas
Hum TV original programming
Television shows set in Karachi